Terrace Heights is a census-designated place (CDP) in Yakima County, Washington, United States. The population was 6,937 at the 2010 census.  It is essentially a suburb of the city of Yakima.

Geography
Terrace Heights is located at  (46.606682, -120.454026).

According to the United States Census Bureau, the CDP has a total area of 8.2 square miles (21.2 km2), of which, 7.9 square miles (20.5 km2) of it is land and 0.3 square miles (0.8 km2) of it (3.66%) is water.

Demographics
As of the census of 2007, there were 8,031 people, 3,754 households, and 2,005 families residing in the CDP. The population density was 816.3 people per square mile (315.1/km2). There were 2,609 housing units at an average density of 330.3/sq mi (127.5/km2). The racial makeup of the CDP was 88.58% White, 0.84% African American, 1.13% Native American, 0.51% Asian, 0.02% Pacific Islander, 6.03% from other races, and 2.89% from two or more races. Hispanic or Latino of any race were 11.06% of the population.

There were 3,754 households, out of which 31.4% had children under the age of 18 living with them, 62.0% were married couples living together, 8.7% had a female householder with no husband present, and 26.0% were non-families. 20.9% of all households were made up of individuals, and 8.3% had someone living alone who was 65 years of age or older. The average household size was 2.54 and the average family size was 2.93.

In the CDP, the age distribution of the population shows 24.4% under the age of 18, 7.1% from 18 to 24, 27.1% from 25 to 44, 26.7% from 45 to 64, and 14.7% who were 65 years of age or older. The median age was 40 years. For every 100 females, there were 94.9 males. For every 100 females age 18 and over, there were 93.8 males.

The median income for a household in the CDP was $47,601, and the median income for a family was $53,938. Males had a median income of $39,813 versus $26,925 for females. The per capita income for the CDP was $21,542. About 5.3% of families and 7.5% of the population were below the poverty line, including 7.1% of those under age 18 and 6.0% of those age 65 or over.

References

External links
 Yakima Family Times local newspaper of family living

Census-designated places in Yakima County, Washington
Census-designated places in Washington (state)
Populated places on the Yakima River